Midnight Court may refer to:
"The Midnight Court", an Irish-language poem by 18th-century poet Brian Merriman
Midnight Court (film), a 1937 Warner Bros film
Midnight Court (horse), a racehorse
Alternative courts employed by Irish secret societies in the late 18th and early 19th centuries